Wild Pitch Records was an American hip hop record label, started in 1987 by Stuart Fine, that was eventually distributed by EMI. Artists who released records on the label included Main Source, Lord Finesse, Ultramagnetic MCs, Chill Rob G, Gang Starr, UMC's, O.C., Broken English, Klik, Jamose, Hard Knocks, female rapper N-Tyce, Super Lover Cee and Casanova Rud, and The Coup. Together, Fine and Howard re-established and released the label's catalogue, while also releasing records by Mary Lees Corvette, BigMouth, Mighty Purple, the Wallmans, and Chico Hamilton under its All Points Jazz label. The hip hop catalogue was eventually acquired by Jay Faires, who tried to reactivate it as part of his short-lived JCOR Entertainment label. 

As the majority of its albums were released in the early 1990s and went out of print, Faires re-released the label's catalog on April 22, 2008, through Fontana Distribution.

References

American record labels
Hip hop record labels